Prime Ministry Intelligence Office was an Intelligence agency in Iran directly subordinated to the Prime Minister's Office. The agency was formed after Iranian Revolution to be successor to the dissolved SAVAK, and turned into Ministry of Intelligence in 1984. The office was founded by Khosrow Tehrani, and after an agreement with Intelligence Organization of the Islamic Revolutionary Guard Corps, which was mainly focused on foreign intelligence and counter-intelligence.

References 

Government agencies established in 1980
Government agencies disestablished in 1984
Organisations of the Iranian Revolution
Defunct Iranian intelligence agencies